Vincenzo Mangiacapre (born 17 January 1989 in Marcianise) is an Italian boxer, who won bronze at the 2011 World Amateur Boxing Championships and the 2012 Olympics.

Biography
In June he won Bronze at the 2011 European Amateur Boxing Championships where he lost to Thomas Stalker. At the 2011 World Amateur Boxing Championships in September he beat three opponents before losing to Éverton Lopes 7:16. He qualified for the Olympics.

At the Olympics (results) he beat Gyula Káté 20:14 and Daniyar Yeleussinov 16:12 but lost to Cuban star Roniel Iglesias 8:15 in the semifinal and won bronze.

References

External links
 
 
 
 

1989 births
Living people
Light-welterweight boxers
Boxers at the 2012 Summer Olympics
Olympic boxers of Italy
Olympic bronze medalists for Italy
Olympic medalists in boxing
Medalists at the 2012 Summer Olympics
People from Marcianise
Sportspeople from the Province of Caserta
Italian male boxers
Boxers at the 2015 European Games
European Games silver medalists for Italy
European Games medalists in boxing
AIBA World Boxing Championships medalists
Boxers at the 2016 Summer Olympics
Boxers at the 2019 European Games
Boxers of Fiamme Azzurre
21st-century Italian people